Wainman's Pinnacle, originally built as a folly (and still used as a folly), is a stone obelisk in Sutton-in-Craven, North Yorkshire. It tends to be referred to as ‘Cowling Pinnacle’ or 'The Salt Pot' and could also be seen as being a part of the village of Cowling.  It has been a grade II listed building in the National Heritage List for England since 23 October 1984.  Wainman’s Pinnacle is situated upon Earl Crag and is often associated with Lund’s Tower as they are both locally known as the Salt and Pepper Pots.

History 
Wainman’s Pinnacle was built in 1898 as a memorial to the Napoleonic Wars by a man known as Wainman, and is thought to have been designed by R. B. Broster & Sons.  It was rebuilt in 1900 by locals following a lightning strike.

Gallery

References

External links 

 Cowling Parish Council
 Moonrakers - Cowling’s Local History Group

Folly towers in England
Grade II listed buildings in North Yorkshire
Towers completed in 1898